Red Dragon, in comics, may refer to:

 Red Dragon, a DC Comics supervillain
 Red Dragon, a character from Grant Morrison's series Zenith
 Red Dragon, a Comico Comics character who was connected to the Elementals
 Red Dragon, the personification of the symbol of Wales who appeared in the Marvel MAX limited series Wisdom
 Red Dragon, a Tower Comics character who appeared in T.H.U.N.D.E.R. Agents

See also
Red dragon (disambiguation)
Dragon (disambiguation)

References